Pole Creek Fire may refer to:

 Pole Creek Fire (2018), a wildfire in the Uinta and Manti-La Sal national forests in central Utah, United States
 Pole Creek Fire (2017), a wildfire in the Bridger-Teton National Forest in northwestern Wyoming, United States
 Pole Creek Fire (2012), a wildfire in the Three Sisters Wilderness in western Oregon, United States